Kutiru (also Romanized as Kūtīrū; also known as Gūtīrū, Katīrdān, Kītrdān, Kotīredān, and Kūtīrd) is a village in Talang Rural District, Talang District, Qasr-e Qand County, Sistan and Baluchestan Province, Iran. At the 2006 census, its population was 336, in 60 families.

References 

Populated places in Qasr-e Qand County